Isaac Burpee,  (November 28, 1825 – March 1, 1885) was a Canadian merchant, entrepreneur, and politician.

Born in Sheffield, New Brunswick, the son of Isaac Burpee and Phoebe Coban, he was elected as a Liberal to the House of Commons of Canada in 1872 representing the riding of City and County of St. John, New Brunswick. He was the Minister of Customs and Minister of Agriculture (Acting). He served until his death in 1885.

Electoral record

References
 
 

1825 births
1885 deaths
Liberal Party of Canada MPs
Members of the House of Commons of Canada from New Brunswick
Members of the King's Privy Council for Canada